Nomorhamphus towoetii is a species of fish in the family Hemiramphidae.

Information
Nomorhamphus towoetii is endemic to Indonesia. This species can be found in a freshwater system. Facts and information about the population trends about this species are limited and not details are lacking about population. This species is recorded to be found in the Lake Towuti system in central Sulawesi, Indonesia. It is considered to be an endangered species due to the fact that it has a limited and restricted extent of occurrence within five locations. There are major threats within a few of these locations as well.

Threats
The threats to the population of Nomorhamphus towoetii include the following:
expansion of human population 
pollution by nearby nickel mines
disturbance from a hydro-electric power station
exotic fish invasions in the lakes
logging in the forests
increase sediment in the lake

References

towoetii
Freshwater fish of Indonesia
Taxonomy articles created by Polbot